

Buildings and structures

Buildings
 1010
 Svetitskhoveli Cathedral in Mtskheta, Georgia commissioned. Building finished in 1929.
 Brihadeeswarar Temple in Thanjavur, southern India, completed.
 1011
 San Vittore alle Chiuse in Genga, Papal States built.
 Imperial Citadel of Thăng Long in Hanoi, Đại Việt begun.
 c. 1012 – Katholikon of Hosios Loukas built in Byzantine Greece.
 1013
 Al-Hakim Mosque in Cairo, Fatimid Empire built (begun in 990).
 San Miniato al Monte begun in Florence, Italy (work continues until the 13th century).
 1016
 San Michele in Borgo in Pisa, Italy built.
 Cluniac Abbey Church of Saint-Bénigne, Dijon, Burgundy consecrated.
 c. 1017 – Hōjōji (法成寺) built in Heian-kyō, Japan.

References

11th-century architecture
Architecture